Apple in the River is a 1974 Latvian drama film directed by Aivars Freimanis.

Plot 
Young docker acquainted with the student Anita, who came to Riga from a small fishing village. She accepted the invitation of the young man she liked to spend the evening at the club, where he played in amateur vocal and instrumental ensemble. After the dance, they go to Janis, but the next day Anita comes home unexpectedly. All attempts to find her Janis at the home of relatives in Riga fails.

Cast 
 Akvelīna Līvmane — Anita
 Ivars Kalniņš — Janis

References

External links 
 

Latvian drama films
Soviet drama films
1974 films
1974 drama films
Latvian-language films
Soviet-era Latvian films